is a Japanese yaoi light novel series written by Michi Ichiho and illustrated by Lala Takemiya. The stories are serialized in the quarterly magazine Shōsetsu Dear+ since 2013. Shinshokan have published three volumes, three side stories, and two spin-off volumes since November 2014 under their Dear+ Bunko imprint. Seven Seas Entertainment has licensed the series in English for North American release. An anime film adaptation by Lesprit premiered on December 11, 2020.

Plot
Kei Kunieda, a popular TV host, is known for his professional behavior, but his behavior is the opposite in private. One day, Ushio Tsuzuki, a stop-motion animator, discovers his off-camera personality when they run into each other at the grocery store, where a bicycle accident causes Ushio to injure his wrist. Kei is forced to help Ushio while he recovers, and in an attempt to prevent him from discovering his secret, he gives his name as "Owari." Ushio, however, comes to love him for who he truly is, and Kei struggles with his own feelings as well as hiding the truth from him.

Characters

Media

Light novels

Main series

Side stories

Spin-offs

Anime film
An anime adaptation was announced on October 31, 2019, later revealed in 2020 to be a film. It is animated by Lesprit, with Masahiro Takata directing, Toshiyuki Morikawa as producer, Ayano Ōwada designing the characters, and Tomoki Hasegawa composing the music. The film premiered in Japanese theaters on December 11, 2020 as part of the BL Fes!! project's first event screenings. Atsushi Abe and Yoshihisa Kawahara performed the film's theme song "Sekai to Kakurenbo" as their respective characters. On March 10, 2021, Crunchyroll announced they had acquired streaming rights for the film outside of Asia and German-speaking Europe, releasing it on the same day.

Reception
The light novel series ranked first in 2016, 2018, and 2019 and second in 2017 in Next Books's annual light novel guide book Kono BL ga Yabai!, in the novel category. The series also ranked third in the Yomiuri Shimbun's Sugoi Japan Award in 2017, in the light novel category.

References

External links
  

2014 Japanese novels
Anime and manga based on light novels
Crunchyroll anime
Lesprit
LGBT in anime and manga
Light novels
Seven Seas Entertainment titles
Shinshokan
Yaoi anime and manga
Yaoi light novels
2010s LGBT literature